Kirk Rient Grybowski (January 31, 1938 – October 8, 2002) was a sailor from United States Virgin Island, who represented his country at the 1984 Summer Olympics in Los Angeles, United States as crew member in the Soling. With helmsman Jean Braure and fellow crew member Marlon Singh they took the 22nd place.

References

External links
 
 
 

1939 births
2002 deaths
United States Virgin Islands male sailors (sport)
Olympic sailors of the United States Virgin Islands
Sailors at the 1984 Summer Olympics – Soling